Lancelot Charles Digby Robinson (23 October 1905 – 31 May 1935) was an English first-class cricketer. 
 
Robinson was educated at Bedford School and played as an all-rounder for their cricket XI, topping their bowling averages in 1922. He moved in 1924 to the Royal Military College, Sandhurst. It was then that he also started playing for Bedfordshire in the Minor Counties Championship.

His only first-class appearance came in 1934, against Ireland at College Park, Dublin. Playing for the Marylebone Cricket Club, Robinson came in at eight in the batting order and was his side's second top scorer with 39 runs, in what would be his only innings.

A captain with the Royal Army Ordnance Corps, Robinson was killed, along with his wife, in the 1935 Quetta earthquake.

References

1905 births
1935 deaths
Bedfordshire cricketers
Deaths in earthquakes
English cricketers
Graduates of the Royal Military College, Sandhurst
Marylebone Cricket Club cricketers
Natural disaster deaths in Pakistan
Royal Army Ordnance Corps officers
People educated at Bedford School
20th-century British Army personnel